Goodenia salina is a species of flowering plant in the family Goodeniaceae and endemic to the south-west of Western Australia. It is an annual herb with lobed, oblong to lance-shaped leaves with the narrower end towards the base, arranged in a rosette at the base of the plant, and cymes of yellow flowers.

Description
Flowering occurs from September to October with fruit forming in December.

Taxonomy and naming
Goodenia salina was first formally described in 2007 by Leigh William Sage and Kelly Anne Shepherd in the journal Nuytsia from material collected near Lake King in 1993. The specific epithet (salina) means "saline", referring to the habitat of this species.

Distribution and habitat
This goodenia is only known from two populations north-east of Albany in the Coolgardie and Mallee biogeographic regions, where it grows in well-drained saline soils on dunes near salt pans.

Conservation status
Goddenia salina is classified as "Priority Two" by the Western Australian Government Department of Parks and Wildlife meaning that it is poorly known and from only one or a few locations.

References

salina
Eudicots of Western Australia
Plants described in 2007
Taxa named by Kelly Anne Shepherd